Guido Rossa (1 December 1934 – 24 January 1979) was an Italian worker and syndicalist who was born in Cesiomaggiore, Veneto and lived for several years in Turin. His first job was at the age of 14 as a worker in a ball bearing factory, then at Fiat in Turin as a milling machine worker. 
In 1961 he moved to Genoa to work for Italsider and, the following year, was elected to the labor union FIOM-CGIL. As a member of the Italian Communist Party, he was a trade unionist for the labor union CGIL at Italsider in Genoa-Cornigliano. He denounced to the Italian police a colleague, Francesco Berardi, who produced propaganda at Italsider on behalf of the Red Brigades. In retaliation, Rossa was killed by the Red Brigades on 24 January 1979, during the Years of Lead.

See also
 Aldo Moro
 Kidnapping of Aldo Moro

References

1979 deaths
Italian communists
Italian trade unionists
Italian syndicalists
1934 births